Dhanwar is a community development block (CD block) that forms an administrative division in the Khori Mahuwa subdivision of the Giridih district in the Indian state of Jharkhand.

Overview
Giridih is a plateau region. The western portion of the district is part of a larger central plateau. The rest of the district is a lower plateau, a flat table land with an elevation of about 1,300 feet. At the edges, the ghats drop to about 700 feet. The Pareshnath Hills or Shikharji rises to a height of 4,480 feet in the south-eastern part of the district. The district is thickly forested. Amongst the natural resources, it has coal and mica. Inaugurating the Pradhan Mantri Ujjwala Yojana in 2016, Raghubar Das, Chief Minister of Jharkhand, had indicated that there were 23 lakh BPL families in Jharkhand. There was a plan to bring the BPL proportion in the total population down to 35%.

Maoist activities
Jharkhand is one of the states affected by Maoist activities. , Giridih was one of the 14 highly affected districts in the state. , Giridih was identified as one of the 13 focus areas by the state police to check Maoist activities. In 2017, the Moists, in Giridih district, have torched more than 50 vehicles engaged in road construction or carrying goods.

Geography
Dhanwar is located at .It has an average elevation of 336 metres (1102 feet).

Dhanwar CD block is bounded by Gawan, Tisri and Deori CD blocks on the north, Jamua CD block on the east, Birni CD block on the south and Domchanch and Markacho CD blocks, in Koderma district, on the west.

Dhanwar CD block has an area of 352.41 km2. It has 39 gram panchayats, 279 inhabited villages and 1 census town.. Dhanwar is the census town. Dhanwar police station serves this block. Headquarters of this CD block is at Dhanwar. 17.17% of the area has forest cover.

Rivers in Dhanwar CD block are Irga and Barako.

Gram panchayats in Dhanwar CD block are: Maheshmarwa, Balhara, Dornda (N), Dornda (S), Sirsai, Garjasaran, Lal Bazar, Bandhi, Ambatand, Pandeydih, Dhanwar (N), Dhanwar (S), Panchrukhi, Bhalitunda, Pandriya, Dhanaipura, Dumardiha, Gundari, Arkhango, Nimadih, Jeruadih, Makdiha, Chandrakho, Sapamaran, Barjo, Jarisingha, Gadi, Kendua, Giridih, Galwati, Kargali Khurd, Gorhand, Chatti, Dharampur, Bodgo, Hemrodih, Siramdih, Kailadhab and Parsan.

Demographics

Population
According to the 2011 Census of India, Dhanwar CD block had a total population of 267,352, of which 258,575 were rural and 8,777 were urban. There were 138,380 (52%) males and 128,972 (48%) females. Population in the age range 0–6 years was 50,403. Scheduled Castes numbered 35,200 (13.17%) and Scheduled Tribes numbered 2,064 (0.77%).

The only census town in Dhanwar CD block is (2011 census population figure in brackets): Dhanwar (8,777).

Literacy
 census the total number of literate persons in Dhanwar CD block was 141,963 (65.44% of the population over 6 years) out of which males numbered 89,562 (79.63% of the male population over 6 years) and females numbered 52,401 (50.16% of the female population over 6 years). The gender disparity (the difference between female and male literacy rates) was 29.47%.

 census, literacy in Giridih district was 63.14%  Literacy in Jharkhand was 66.41% in 2011. Literacy in India in 2011 was 74.04%.

See also – List of Jharkhand districts ranked by literacy rate

Language and religion

Khortha is the main spoken language. Hindi is the official language. Urdu is also spoken.

Rural poverty
40-50% of the population of Giridih district were in the BPL category in 2004–2005, being in the same category as Godda, Koderma and Hazaribagh districts. Rural poverty in Jharkhand declined from 66% in 1993–94 to 46% in 2004–05. In 2011, it has come down to 39.1%.

Economy

Livelihood

In Dhanwar CD block in 2011, amongst the class of total workers, cultivators numbered 58,318 and formed 47.13%, agricultural labourers numbered 40,014 and formed 32.34%, household industry workers numbered 4,297 and formed 3.47% and other workers numbered 21,114 and formed 17.06%. Total workers numbered 123,743 and formed 46.28% of the total population, and non-workers numbered 143,609 and formed 53.72% of the population.

Note: In the census records a person is considered a cultivator, if the person is engaged in cultivation/ supervision of land owned. When a person who works on another person's land for wages in cash or kind or share, is regarded as an agricultural labourer. Household industry is defined as an industry conducted by one or more members of the family within the household or village, and one that does not qualify for registration as a factory under the Factories Act. Other workers are persons engaged in some economic activity other than cultivators, agricultural labourers and household workers.  It includes factory, mining, plantation, transport and office workers, those engaged in business and commerce, teachers, entertainment artistes and so on.

Infrastructure
There are 279 inhabited villages in Dhanwar CD block. In 2011, 147 villages had power supply. 18 villages had tap water (treated/ untreated), 277 villages had well water (covered/ uncovered), 262 villages had hand pumps, and all villages had drinking water facility. 33 villages had post offices, 16 villages had a sub post office, 7 villages had telephones (land lines) and 21 villages had mobile phone coverage. 275 villages had pucca (paved) village roads, 23 villages had bus service (public/ private), 15 villages had autos/ modified autos, and 68 villages had tractors. 26 villages had bank branches, 12 villages had agricultural credit societies, 12 villages had cinema/ video halls, 9 villages had public library and public reading room. 106 villages had public distribution system, 27 villages had weekly haat (market) and 185 villages had assembly polling stations.

Agriculture
Hills occupy a large portion of Giridih district. The soil is generally rocky and sandy and that helps jungles and bushes to grow.  The forest area, forming a large portion of total area, in the district is evenly distributed all over. Some areas near the rivers have alluvial soil. In Dhanwar CD block, the percentage of cultivable area to total area is 25.17%. The percentage of cultivable area to the total area for the district, as a whole, is 27.04%. Irrigation is inadequate. The percentage of irrigated area to cultivable area in Dhanwar CD block is 17.41%. May to October is the Kharif season, followed by the Rabi season. Rice, sown in 50% of the gross sown area, is the main crop in the district. Other important crops grown are: maize, wheat, sugar cane, pulses and vegetables.

Backward Regions Grant Fund
Giridih district is listed as a backward region and receives financial support from the Backward Regions Grant Fund. The fund created by the Government of India is designed to redress regional imbalances in development. As of 2012, 272 districts across the country were listed under this scheme. The list includes 21 districts of Jharkhand.

Transport
State Highway 13 (Jharkhand), running from Koderma to Gobindpur on NH 19 (old NH 2)/ Grand Trunk Road, passes through this block. 

Madhupur-Giridih-Koderma line passes through this block and there is a station at Raj Dhanwar.

Education
Dhanwar CD block had 99 villages with pre-primary schools, 216 villages with primary schools, 99 villages with middle schools, 17 villages with secondary schools, 4 villages with senior secondary schools, 1 village with a general degree college, 57 villages with no educational facility.
.*Senior secondary schools are also known as Inter colleges in Jharkhand

 Adarsh College was established at Rajdhanwar in 1973.

Sanskrit Hindi Vidyapith was established at Jharkhand Dham, Giridih, in 1967. It is an institute specializing in Sanskrit, but also offers other courses. It is affiliated to Vinoba Bhave University. It has hostel facilities.

Healthcare
Dhanwar CD block had 6 villages with primary health centres, 25 villages with primary health subcentres, 5 villages with maternity and child welfare centres, 5 villages with allopathic hospitals, 10 villages with dispensaries, 3 villages with veterinary hospitals, 4 villages with family welfare centres, 30 villages with medicine shops.
.*Private medical practitioners, alternative medicine etc. not included

References

Community development blocks in Giridih district